The Rape of the Sabine Women was an incident in Roman mythology.

The Rape of the Sabine Women may also refer to:
 The Rape of the Sabine Women (1962 film), a historical drama film
 The Rape of the Sabine Women (2006 film), an art film by Eve Sussman
 The Rape of the Sabine Women (Rubens), a painting by Peter Paul Rubens

See also
 The Abduction of the Sabine Women (disambiguation)